An elevated railway or elevated train (also known as an el train for short) is a rapid transit railway with the tracks above street level on a viaduct or other elevated structure (usually constructed from steel, cast iron, concrete, or bricks). The railway may be broad-gauge, standard-gauge or narrow-gauge railway, light rail, monorail, or a suspension railway. Elevated railways are normally found in urban areas where there would otherwise be multiple level crossings. Usually, the tracks of elevated railways that run on steel viaducts can be seen from street level.

History

The earliest elevated railway was the London and Greenwich Railway on a brick viaduct of 878 arches, built between 1836 and 1838. The first  of the London and Blackwall Railway (1840) was also built on a viaduct. During the 1840s there were other plans for elevated railways in London that never came to fruition.

From the late 1860s onward, elevated railways became popular in US cities. The New York West Side and Yonkers Patent Railway operated with cable cars from 1868 to 1870, thereafter locomotive-hauled. This was followed by the Manhattan Railway Company in 1875, the South Side Elevated Railroad, Chicago (1892–), and the elevated lines of the Boston Elevated Railway (1901–). The Chicago transit system itself is known as the "L", short for "elevated". The Berlin Stadtbahn (1882) and the Vienna Stadtbahn (1898) are also mainly elevated.

The first electric elevated railway was the Liverpool Overhead Railway, which operated through Liverpool docks from 1893 until 1956.

In London, the Docklands Light Railway is a modern elevated railway that opened in 1987 and, since, has expanded. The trains are driverless and automatic.

Another modern elevated railway is Tokyo's driverless Yurikamome line, opened in 1995.

Systems

Monorail systems
Most monorails are elevated railways, such as the Disneyland Monorail System (1959), the Tokyo Monorail (1964), the Sydney Monorail (1988–2013), the KL Monorail, the Las Vegas Monorail, the Seattle Center Monorail and the São Paulo Monorail.  Many maglev railways are also elevated.

Suspension railways

During the 1890s there was some interest in suspension railways, particularly in Germany, with the Schwebebahn Dresden, (1891–) and the Wuppertal Schwebebahn (1901). H-Bahn suspension railways were built in Dortmund and Düsseldorf airport, 1975. The Memphis Suspension Railway opened in 1982.

Suspension railways are usually monorail; Shonan Monorail and Chiba Urban Monorail in Japan, despite their names, are suspension railways.

People mover systems
People mover or automated people mover (APM) is a type of driverless grade-separated, mass-transit system. The term is generally used only to describe systems that serve as loops or feeder systems, but is sometimes applied to considerably more complex automated systems. Similar to monorails, Bombardier Innovia APM technology uses only one rail to guide the vehicle along the guideway. APMs are common at airports and effective at helping passengers quickly reach their gates. Several elevated APM systems at airports including the PHX Sky Train at Phoenix Sky Harbor International Airport; AeroTrain at Kuala Lumpur International Airport; and the Tracked Shuttle System at London Gatwick Airport, United Kingdom.

Modern systems

Full metro system

Americas
 Baltimore Metro (west of Mondawmin)
 BART (partial)
 Chicago "L" (except for parts of the Red Line and Blue Line)
 Cleveland Red Line (partial)
 Guadalajara light rail system Line 3 (partial under construction)
 Honolulu Rail Transit (under construction light metro)
 MARTA (partial)
 Medellín Metro
 Mexico City Metro (partial)
 Miami Metrorail
 New York City Subway (partial)
 Market–Frankford Line (underground in downtown Philadelphia and West Philadelphia up to 40th Street Station but elevated elsewhere)
 PATCO (partial)
 PATH (partial)
 Line 3 Scarborough, a medium capacity metro rail line in Toronto, Ontario, Canada
 SkyTrain, Vancouver, British Columbia, Canada.
 Washington Metro (partial)
 Santiago Metro (partial)
 Lima Metro (partial)

Asia
 Bangalore metro
 Chennai Metro (partial)
 Chennai Mass Rapid Transit System
 Delhi Metro (Yellow Line)(Green Line),(Red Line)
Hanoi Metro
 Hong Kong MTR (Kwun Tong Line, Tsuen Wan Line, Tuen Ma Line, East Rail Line, South Island Line and Tung Chung Line) (all partial)
 Hyderabad Metro
 Kochi Metro
 Kolkata Metro (future line 5 & 6, later is under construction)
 Lahore Metro (Orange Line)
 Manila Light Rail Transit System
 Mumbai Metro
 Mumbai Monorail
 Nagpur Metro
 Rapid Metro Gurgaon
 Rapid Rail, the operator of the rapid transit (metro) system serving Kuala Lumpur and the Klang Valley area in Malaysia.
 BTS Skytrain, two elevated rapid transit lines in Bangkok, Thailand
 Wenhu line, Taipei, Taiwan

Europe

 Berlin U-Bahn (U1 and U2 lines)
 Copenhagen Metro
 Docklands Light Railway (partial)
 Frankfurt U-Bahn: U1 (partial)
 Hamburg U-Bahn (U3 line)
 Paris Metro  (Line 1, Line 2, Line 5, Line 6, Line 8 and Line 13) (all partial)
 Vienna U-Bahn (U6 line)
 Wuppertal Suspension Railway
 Stockholm Metro (Slussen-Gamla Stan)

Oceania
 Melbourne Metro
 Sydney Metro Northwest Line in Sydney, Australia (skytrain section)

Disused

 Boston Elevated Railways - Atlantic Avenue Elevated, Charlestown Elevated, Washington Street Elevated, Causeway Street Elevated
 Elevated railways operated by the Interborough Rapid Transit Company and Brooklyn Rapid Transit Company in New York City
 Liverpool Overhead Railway
 The elevated Airport line of Kolkata Suburban Railway, closed in 2016 for reconstruction relating Kolkata Metro line 4

People mover
 Tomorrowland Transit Authority PeopleMover, a people mover at and around Tomorrowland, Magic Kingdom, Walt Disney World Resort, Orlando, Florida, United States
 AirTrain JFK, a people mover at and around John F. Kennedy International Airport, New York City, New York, United States
 ATL Skytrain, a people mover at Hartsfield–Jackson Atlanta International Airport, Atlanta, Georgia, United States
 Changi Airport Skytrain, an inter-terminal people mover at Changi International Airport in Singapore
 Detroit People Mover, an urban transit people mover in Detroit, Michigan, United States
 H-Bahn, an inter-terminal automated people mover in Dortmund and Düsseldorf, Germany
 Metromover, a people mover at Miami, Florida, United States
 PHX Sky Train, a people mover at Phoenix Sky Harbor International Airport, Phoenix, Arizona, United States

Proposed designs
 UC San Diego Blue Line extension will mostly be aerial light rail.
 Réseau express métropolitain
 Phnom Penh SkyTrain (Cambodia)
Ho Chi Minh City Metro (Vietnam) will be partially elevated
 Managua Metro (Nicaragua)
 San Salvador Metro (El Salvador)
 Ljubljana Metro (Slovenia)

See also

 Bombardier Innovia family of automated rapid transit systems (elevated technologies - Monorail, APM, Metro)
 Elevator
 Embankment (transportation)
 Grade separation
 Monorail
 Railway
 Rapid transit
 People mover

References

Railways by type